The 1934 Idaho gubernatorial election was held on November 6. Incumbent Democrat C. Ben Ross defeated Republican nominee Frank Stephan with 54.58% of the vote.

This was the last re-election of an incumbent Idaho governor for 24 years, until 1958.

Ross opted not to run for a fourth term in 1936; he ran for the U.S. Senate against its dean, Republican William Borah, who won a sixth term.

Primary elections
Primary elections were held on August 14, 1934.

Democratic primary

Candidates
C. Ben Ross, incumbent governor
Frank Martin, Boise, former attorney general
Asher Wilson, Twin Falls

Republican primary

Candidates
Frank Stephan, Twin Falls
J. Wesley Holden, Idaho Falls attorney
H. F. Fait

General election

Candidates
Major party candidates
C. Ben Ross, Democratic
Frank Stephan, Republican 

Other candidates
Allen F. Adams, Socialist
T. H. Darrow, Independent

Results

References

1934
Idaho
Gubernatorial